The Commander of the Azerbaijani Navy is the head of the Naval operations and the administrative head in the Azerbaijani Navy, and is under the Chief of the General Staff and the Minister of Defence. The current Commander of the Navy is Rear Admiral .

List of commanders

References

Azerbaijani Navy personnel
1991 establishments in Azerbaijan
Azerbaijan